Chaunggauk is a village in Taunggyi Township, Taunggyi District, Shan State, of Burma (Myanmar). It lies to the north of the town of Taunggyi.

References

External links
"Chaunggauk Map — Satellite Images of Chaunggauk" Maplandia

Populated places in Shan State